Per Fly Plejdrup (born 14 January 1960) is a Danish film director, generally credited simply as Per Fly. He has made many films and television shows broadcast on Danish television. Per Fly's awards includes the Crown Prince Couple's Culture Prize in 2005.

Biography
Fly graduated from The National Film School of Denmark in 1993. He debuted in 2000 with the feature film Bænken (The Bench), which told the story of Kaj, a man whose life has led him into serious alcoholism. This film was the first part of what would become the Denmark trilogy, which portrayed situations and characters from the lower, upper and middle classes in Denmark, in that order. The stop-motion animation film Prop og Berta (Prop and Berta, 2001) followed Bænken, but was not part of the trilogy. The trilogy continued with Arven (The Inheritance, 2003) depicting the upper class, and the middle class in Drabet (Manslaughter, 2005).

In 2007 he shot a series entitled Forestillinger, broadcast on Danish television Danmarks Radio. It pivots on the same period of time from the perspective of six different people, whose life situations overlap and intertwine. The meaning of the word Forestillinger is ambiguous in Danish language, and can refer to "conceptions" or (as in "conceptions about one self") as well as "plays" or "shows" in the theatrical sense. It was titled "Performances" for the English-subtitled DVD release.

With the exception of Prop og Berta, the nature of Per Fly's filmography is centered on the lives of ordinary people, in the vein of social realism. His films explore the conditions under which the characters are living, and try to validate or explain the choices they make through a detailed psychological and social depiction of the characters involved.

Personal life 
He is married to Danish actress Charlotte Fich. They have two children Anton and Aksel together.

Filmography

Other works

Awards

References

External links

Per Fly at the Danish movies and television database

1960 births
Living people
Danish male screenwriters
Danish film directors
Best Director Guldbagge Award winners
Recipients of the Crown Prince Couple's Culture Prize
People from Skive Municipality